Knockmore railway station was a station on the Belfast–Newry railway line. The station served the suburb of Knockmore in Lisburn, County Antrim, Northern Ireland. The Great Northern Railway (GNR) opened Knockmore station as a halt in 1932. Northern Ireland Railways (NIR) closed the station on 25 March 2005.

Knockmore station had two platforms. "Down" trains travelling from Portadown to Belfast could not serve Knockmore as it was the middle line with no platform.

History

The station is near Knockmore Junction, which came into service in 1863 for the Banbridge, Lisburn and Belfast Junction Railway (BLB) to connect with the Ulster Railway. The junction gained another branch in 1871 when the Dublin and Antrim Junction Railway (D&A, now the Lisburn–Antrim railway line) was opened. The Ulster Railway, BLB and D&A all became part of the GNR by the end of the 1870s. A halt was finally provided at Knockmore Junction in 1932, but it did not last long and was closed a year later. The GNR was nationalised in 1953 as the GNR Board, which closed Banbridge branch on 29 April 1956.

In 1960, the Antrim branch was closed to passenger traffic, although it remained open for freight. By this point, the line was under UTA control; All GNR assets in Northern Ireland having been ceded to the UTA in 1958. In 1968, the UTA was replaced by Northern Ireland Railways, which reopened the Antrim branch and rerouted all Londonderry line services via Knockmore. A new Knockmore halt was built on a different site to the original, slightly closer to Lisburn. Instead of using a crossover as per the original setup, a 3rd line was laid directly from the former junction to Lisburn station. Unfortunately, this required the demolition of  Knockmore Junction signal cabin.

In 2001 NIR reopened the more direct Belfast – Antrim route via . An attempt was made to keep the Antrim – Knockmore line open alongside it using a skeleton service, but this was unsuccessful and NIR withdrew passenger services altogether in 2003. Due to the platform layout, this left Knockmore station with a train service in only one direction: "down" trains from Belfast to Portadown. This arrangement was not well-used, and so on 25 March 2005, NIR closed Knockmore station.

The Portadown-bound platform was demolished in 2012, with the branch platform following in 2014.

Incidents 
 On 28/06/2012, a section of embankment near Knockmore was washed out by heavy rain, leaving a short length of track unsupported in mid-air. Due to the Irish Open, Translink had put on extra trains to Portrush, some of which were scheduled to use the Antrim branch. The first of these specials was not able to stop in time and crossed over the unsupported track, with the leading vehicle coming to a full stop with one bogie on either side of the unsupported section. The train was slowly reversed back to Lisburn station, and nobody was injured. 
 On 04/02/2016, a Portadown-bound train collided with an excavator bucket which had been left on the track near Knockmore Junction. The leading vehicle was lifted off the rails, coming to a stop 330m from the point of collision with the bucket lodged under the fuel tank, but all wheels on the rails. It was badly damaged and as of August 2016, has not returned to service. One passenger was injured.

The Great Northern Railway to Banbridge and Newcastle
The station was opened by the Banbridge, Lisburn and Belfast Railway on 13 July 1863.

Then 30 April 1956 the line via Dromore to Banbridge and Newcastle, County Down was closed under the auspices of the Ulster Transport Authority.

See also
Lisburn West railway station

References

Sources

External links

Disused railway stations in County Antrim
Railway stations opened in 1932
Railway stations closed in 2005
Buildings and structures in Lisburn
Rail junctions in Northern Ireland
1932 establishments in Northern Ireland
2005 disestablishments in Northern Ireland
Railway stations in Northern Ireland opened in the 20th century